Ripshin Farm, also known as the Sherwood Anderson Farm is a historic farm property at the junction of Routes 603 and 732 near Troutdale, Virginia. It was developed as a summer home and later year-round home by writer Sherwood Anderson (1876–1941), and is where he wrote most of his later works. It was declared a National Historic Landmark in 1971.

Description and history
Ripshin Farm is located in a rural setting in Virginia's southwestern hills, east of the village of Troutdale. It is set on a rise overlooking the confluence of Ripshin and Lauren Creeks, and is accessed by a long drive on the east side of Route 603 north of its junction with Route 732. It includes the main house, two small guest cottages, and a log cabin in which Anderson did his writing. The main house is 1½ stories in height, with a central section of fieldstone flanked by log wings.

The property was a small farm when Sherwood Anderson purchased it in 1925. He at first lived in a log cabin on the site, while the house was under construction. It would serve as his home and principal writing location until his death in 1941. Anderson was one of the first writers of his time to create candid depictions of  the sometimes gritty aspects of life, and for his frankly self-revealing works.  He was acknowledged as a major influence on a generation of writers, including William Faulkner, Stephen Vincent Benét, and Eudora Welty. Anderson's only bestseller in his career, Dark Laughter, was completed here in 1925.

See also
National Register of Historic Places listings in Grayson County, Virginia
List of National Historic Landmarks in Virginia

References

External links
Ripshin Farm, Grayson County, one photo at Virginia DHR

Houses on the National Register of Historic Places in Virginia
National Historic Landmarks in Virginia
Houses in Grayson County, Virginia
Houses completed in 1925
National Register of Historic Places in Grayson County, Virginia